Suhara Station is the name of two train stations in Japan:

 Suhara Station (Gifu) (洲原駅)
 Suhara Station (Nagano) (須原駅)